Dagon Win Aung is a Burmese businessman and chairman of the Union of Myanmar Federation of Chambers of Commerce and Industry (UMFCCI).  He founded Dagon International, a construction company, in the 1990s, with Win Thein, a Myanmar Army captain.  He has since expanded his business empire to the timber trade, construction and import-export sectors. Following Cyclone Nargis in 2008, his company was awarded with government contracts for various reconstruction projects in the Irrawaddy delta.

References

Burmese businesspeople
1953 births
Living people
People from Bago Region